Geometriae Dedicata is a mathematical journal, founded in 1972, concentrating on geometry and its relationship to topology, group theory and the theory of dynamical systems. It was created on the initiative of Hans Freudenthal in Utrecht, the Netherlands. It is published by Springer Netherlands. The Editors-in-Chief are John R. Parker and Jean-Marc Schlenker.

References

External links
 Springer site

Mathematics journals
Springer Science+Business Media academic journals